Sanda Thuriya II  was a king of the Mrauk-U Dynasty of Arakan.

References

Bibliography
 
 
 
 

Thuriya II
Thuriya II
Thuriya II